U.S. Route 601 (US 601) is a north–south United States highway that runs for  from U.S. Route 321, near Tarboro, South Carolina, to U.S. Route 52, in Mount Airy, North Carolina. In North Carolina, it is one of the main north-south corridors connecting the cities of Salisbury, Mocksville, and Mount Airy.

Route description

South Carolina
US 601 begins at US 321 near Tarboro, SC and intersects with such highways as US 278 in Hampton. Beginning in Bamberg US 601 has an overlap with US 301, then intersects US 78. Within the vicinity of Orangeburg, the overlap with US 301 ends at US 21, then it encounters Interstate 26 at Exit 145. In the vicinity of Lugoff, US 601 encounters Interstate 20 at exit 92 near then begins another short overlap with US 1 which last until Camden where that concurrency is replaced by US 521 which last slightly longer than the previous one, ending in Kershaw. The route joins SC 9 three miles west of Pageland, then leaves SC 9 when it arrives in downtown Pageland before eventually crossing the North Carolina border.

North Carolina
After crossing the north–South Carolina border, US 601 intersects with such highways as US 74 in Monroe, which it shares a short concurrency with until the interchange with the northern terminus of NC 207. At the northern city limits of Monroe, it interchanges with the Monroe Expressway. Traveling north along what is now known as "Concord Highway" it encounters another intersection with the NC 24/NC 27 overlap in Midland and later an interchange with NC 49 south of Concord. Also in Concord, it joins US 29 which it overlaps until Interstate 85 at Exit 58 and runs along the interstate until it reaches Salisbury, at exit 75, then joins a brief concurrency with US 70. In Mocksville, the road has a short concurrency with US 64 beginning at the western terminus of US 158, and after leaving that overlap encounters Interstate 40 at exit 170. Further north it has an interchange with US 421 in Yadkinville, Interstate 74 at exit 11 near White Plains, and finally terminates at US 52 in Mount Airy.

History
Established in 1927 as an original US Highway; the original routing was from US 1, in Cheraw, to US 17/US 76, in Florence.

In 1932, US 601 was extended north into North Carolina, replacing SC 96.  In North Carolina US 601 was placed on concurrency with almost all of NC 80, from the South Carolina state line, near McFarlan, to downtown Mount Airy.  In 1934, NC 80 was expunged from US 601.

In 1935, most of US 601 was replaced by the arrival of US 52.  From Salisbury, North Carolina to Florence, South Carolina, the route was converted to US 52; which marked its departure from South Carolina.

Around 1952, US 601 was extended south from Salisbury. Starting with a concurrency with US 29 to Kannapolis, from there it followed US 29A to downtown Concord.  Replacing NC 151, it continues south through Monroe and to the state line.  In South Carolina, US 601 returns by replacing SC 151 from the border to Pageland.  From there it replaced SC 902 and part of SC 265 to Kershaw.  Between Kershaw and Camden, it overlaps with US 521, replacing SC 26 (SC 52 before 1935) from Camden to Orangeburg, then in concurrency with US 301 to Bamberg.  Then finally replacing SC 36 to US 321, where it continues and ends with US 321 in Hardeeville.

In 1965, US 601 was realigned on new road bypassing west of downtown Concord, leaving a business loop. In 1970, US 601 was realigned on new road bypassing east of Dobson, leaving a business loop. In 1974, US 601 was extended to Interstate 95 in Hardeeville; however, by 1977, US 601 was truncated to its current southern terminus at US 321, near Tarboro.  In 1979, US 601 was rerouted west of Salisbury, with concurrency with US 70; Innis Street was downgraded to secondary status.  In the late 1980s, US 601 was rerouted onto Interstate 85, in Salisbury from exit 68 to exit 74; which was extended in the late 1990s, going south to exit 58 in Concord.

In 1999, US 601 was truncated to its current northern terminus at US 52 in Mount Airy.

South Carolina Highway 26

South Carolina Highway 26 (SC 26) was an original state highway that was established in 1935 as a renumbering of SC 52 from U.S. Route 21 (US 21; now US 21/US 176) in St. Matthews to US 76 near the Wateree River. In July 1936, it was extended north to the Kershaw County line, east of Fort Jackson. In May 1937, SC 26 was extended again to US 1 in Lugoff. In November of that year, its path from the Eastover area to Lugoff was re-routed on new roadway. Its former path through Eastover was redesignated as SC 26 Alternate (US 26 Alt.) In 1940, its path in Richland County was straightened instead of a zigzag shape. Approximately 1948, its crossing of the Congaree River was shifted slightly to the east. In 1950, it was extended south to replace US 21 and ended at US 301 (now SC 33 in Orangeburg. The next year, SC 26 was decommissioned and redesignated as part of US 601.

Eastover alternate route

South Carolina Highway 26 Alternate (SC 26 Alt.) was an alternate route that was established in November 1937 as a renumbering of SC 26 through Eastover. Around 1942, it was decommissioned. It was redesignated as SC 764 east outside of the town and SC 263 north outside of it.

South Carolina Highway 52

South Carolina Highway 52 (SC 52) was a state highway that was established around 1926 from SC 31 / SC 45 (now US 601 and SC 6) in St. Matthews, through Wateree and Eastover, to SC 3 (now US 76/US 378) northwest of Eastover. In 1935, it was decommissioned and redesignated as SC 26. Today, most of its path is known as US 601 and SC 764.

South Carolina Highway 96

South Carolina Highway 96 (SC 96) was a state highway that was established in 1926 on a path from U.S. Route 1 (US 1) and SC 9 in Cheraw to the North Carolina state line, where the roadway continued as North Carolina Highway 80. In 1933, it was decommissioned, and its entire length became part of the original routing of US 601. Today, most of its path is part of US 52.

Junction list

See also

 Special routes of U.S. Route 601

References

External links

Endpoints of US Highway 601

 
01-6
01-6
01-6
6
Transportation in Jasper County, South Carolina
Transportation in Hampton County, South Carolina
Transportation in Bamberg County, South Carolina
Transportation in Orangeburg County, South Carolina
Transportation in Calhoun County, South Carolina
Transportation in Richland County, South Carolina
Transportation in Kershaw County, South Carolina
Transportation in Lancaster County, South Carolina
Transportation in Union County, North Carolina
Transportation in Cabarrus County, North Carolina
Transportation in Rowan County, North Carolina
Transportation in Davie County, North Carolina
Transportation in Yadkin County, North Carolina
Transportation in Surry County, North Carolina
1927 establishments in South Carolina
1927 establishments in North Carolina